NASCAR Nation was a program on the Speed Channel, which aired Monday nights, discussing the lifestyle of NASCAR drivers when they are not on the track. It was cancelled after the 2005 season.

The program began in 2005, effectively replacing Totally NASCAR, which had aired on Fox Sports Net since 2001.  Speed expanded the program to one hour and it was a mixture of hard news, opinion, and feature segments.  It aired Monday through Friday at 7 pm Eastern Time (ET).  

In June 2005, the show carried an interview with NASCAR vice president of competition Robin Pemberton in which he tried to justify the disqualification of Busch Series driver Johnny Sauter.  Due to a technical violation found during post-race inspection, Sauter was stripped of championship points and prize money.  Reportedly, NASCAR officials did not like the tone of the interview.

Whether or not the interview was a factor was never explained publicly, but the week of June 20–24, Speed aired repeats of previous shows, then returned on June 27 with an entirely retooled NASCAR Nation.  The information segments were removed and only the "fluff" elements, as noted above, remained.  The show also received a new set, new theme music, and new hosts.

In August, NASCAR Nation was reduced to Mondays only, at 8 pm ET.  It was part of a new "strip" of weekly NASCAR shows introduced by Speed.  These shows included The Chase is On, One-Track Mind, and Backseat Drivers.

At the end of the 2005 season in November, NASCAR Nation, was cancelled.  Two segments from the show were carried into 2006: "Mikey Mic'd," starring Michael Waltrip, which aired on NASCAR RaceDay but was then canceled; and a trivia segment, which is part of NASCAR Live.

One-Track Mind and Backseat Drivers were also canned.  The Chase is On remained for a few more seasons but has not returned since the end of the 2007 season.

Speed would not have another original nightly show about NASCAR until NASCAR Race Hub debuted on October 10, 2009.

Show segments (original)
"The Big Story": In-depth examination of a NASCAR personality or event
"Home Base": Drivers' lives away from the track
"Nationcast": A look at the weekly weather from the race site
"Time Capsule": Highlights of past NASCAR moments
"Sound-Off": Fans' opinions of various topics (in later version, drivers were asked)
"Mikey Mic'd": Reality mini-show starring Michael Waltrip (also in later version)

Show hosts
Ralph Sheheen and Courtney George (first two weeks)
Ralph Sheheen and Krista Voda (March through June)
Leeann Tweeden, Craig Reynolds, and Shannon Spake (June through November)

In addition, both versions featured contributions from Jon Willenborg, a former contestant on The Apprentice.

Nation
Speed (TV network) original programming
2005 American television series debuts
2005 American television series endings